Lensey Namioka ( or ; born June 14, 1929) is a Chinese-born American writer of books for young adults and children. She writes about China and Chinese American families, as well as Japan, her husband's native country.

Early life and education 
She was born as Lensey Chao in Beijing, the daughter of linguist Yuenren Chao and physician Buwei Yang Chao. The family moved frequently in China. In 1937, the Chaos were living in Nanjing, and fled westward in the face of the Japanese invasion. They eventually made their way to Hawaii, then to Cambridge, Massachusetts.

When she moved to the United States from China at age of nine, Lensey Chao initially knew no English. Because it used the same numerals regardless of languages, math seemed easier to her than other school subjects.

Lensey Chao attended Radcliffe College and the University of California at Berkeley, where her father was a professor of Asian Studies, to study mathematics. Here she met and married Isaac Namioka, a fellow graduate student who was born in Japan. Namioka ended up earning a bachelor's and a master's degree in math.

Origin of her first name 
Lensey Namioka is the only person known to have the first name "Lensey". Her name has an especially unusual property for a Chinese person born in China: there are no Chinese characters to represent it. When Lensey's father was cataloging all of the phonemes used in Chinese, he noted that there were two syllables that were possible in the Chinese language, but which were used in no Chinese words. These syllables could be written in Gwoyeu Romatzyh as "len" and "sey." His third daughter was born soon after, so he named her "Lensey."

Career 
Namioka's first love has been reading and writing adventure stories. As a child, she read Chinese martial arts novels, as well as Sherlock Holmes stories and The Three Musketeers. At the age of eight, she wrote her first book on pieces of scrap paper that she sewed together with thread. It was about a woman warrior called the Princess with a Bamboo Sword. In the 1970s, on a visit to Japan, Namioka visited Namioka Castle. The experience inspired her to learn more about the Samurai. This study culminated in The Samurai and the Long-nosed Devils, which was published in 1976. Namioka expanded this book into a whole series of books about samurai in sixteenth-century Japan.

Namioka has also written a series of books about a Chinese American family named Yang, and several books about young women and girls facing difficult choices, as well as travel books about Japan and China.

Personal life
The Namiokas moved to Ithaca, New York, where Isaac taught at Cornell University, and Lensey taught at Wells College. The family moved to Seattle in 1964, when Isaac accepted a position at the University of Washington.

Namioka has two daughters, Aki (born 1959) and Michi (born 1961).

Awards and recognition
Namioka has won many awards for her work. For instance, Ties That Bind, Ties That Break was named one of the American Library Association's 10 Best Books for Young People, and also won the California Young Reader Medal and the Washington State Governor's Writers Award. She also won the Washington State Governor's Writers Award in 1990 for Island of Ogres.

Publications

Books
 The Samurai and the Long-Nosed Devils (New York: D. McKay, 1976)
 White Serpent Castle (McKay, 1976)
 Japan: a Traveler's Companion (1979)
 Valley of the Broken Cherry Trees (1980)
 Who's Hu? (1981)
 Village of the Vampire Cat (1981)
 China: a Traveler's Companion (1985)
 Phantom of Tiger Mountain (1986)
 Island of Ogres (1989)
 Coming of the Bear (1992)
 Yang the Youngest and His Terrible Ear (1992)
 April and the Dragon Lady (1994)
 Yang the Third and Her Impossible Family (1995)
 The Loyal Cat (1995)
 Den of the White Fox (1997)
 The Laziest Boy in the World (1998)
 Yang the Second and Her Secret Admirers (1998)
 Ties that Bind, Ties that Break (1999)
 Yang the Eldest and His Odd Jobs (2000)
 The Hungriest Boy in the World (2001)
 An Ocean Apart, a World Away (2002)
 Half and Half (2003)
 Mismatch (Delacorte Press, 2006)
 The Lost Village (2012)

Selected short stories
 LAFFF 
 The Inn of Lost Time
 Fox Hunt

References

Sources
 Meet the Author Lensey Namioka, eduplace.com
 Lensey Namioka, goodreads.com
 Biography Lensey Namioka, learner.org

External links

  archived 2013

1929 births
American children's writers
Chinese children's writers
American women children's writers
Chinese women children's writers
Writers from Beijing
Chinese emigrants to the United States
University of California, Berkeley alumni
American writers of Chinese descent
Living people
21st-century American women